The Intercontinental Cup was an association football club competition contested annually from 1960 to 2004 between the winners of the European Cup and the South American Copa Libertadores. The competition was endorsed by both the Union of European Football Associations (UEFA) and the Confederación Sudamericana de Fútbol (CONMEBOL) and, until 1979, it was played over two legs. From 1980, its format was changed to a single match traditionally held in Tokyo, Japan, due to its new sponsorship. The Intercontinental Cup was disbanded in 2004 in favour of the FIFA Club World Cup, which includes the champion clubs from all of the Fédération Internationale de Football Association (FIFA) member confederations.

In its first eight editions, the competition's winner was decided on a points system; if necessary, a play-off match would be held to determine the outcome in case of a tie. In 1968, the system was changed so that aggregate score would dictate the winning club. If the tie was level after both legs, the away goals rule was applied.

Nacional and Peñarol (Uruguay), Boca Juniors (Argentina), Real Madrid (Spain), and A.C. Milan (Italy) hold the record for the most victories, each team having won the competition three times; Milan and Independiente (Argentina) have the most runner-up places (four). Overall, 25 different clubs won the competition during its 45 editions. Argentinian clubs won the most cups, with nine trophies among them; Italian clubs won the second most (seven), and Brazilian teams are third with six victories. The most successful confederation is CONMEBOL, teams representing the confederation have won the competition 22 times and been runners-up 21 times. Teams representing the European football confederation UEFA have won the competition 21 times and been runners-up 22 times. The last Intercontinental Cup was won by 2004 European champions Porto of Portugal, who beat Colombian side Once Caldas by 8–7 in a penalty shootout, after the match finished 0–0.

Winners

Key

Two-legged finals

Single match finals

Results by clubs

Results by country

Results by confederation

Notes 
 After the events of the 1969 Intercontinental Cup, many European Cup champions refused to play in the Intercontinental Cup. On five occasions, they were replaced by the tournaments' runners-up. Additionally, two Intercontinental Cups were called off after runners-up, too, declined to participate.

See also
 List of FIFA Club World Cup finals

Notes

References
General

Specific

Intercontinental Cup (football)
Intercontinental Cup